Three warships of Japan have been named Makinami (巻波), meaning "Overflowing Waves" (Rolling Wave):

  a  launched in 1941 and sunk in 1943
  an  launched in 1960 and decommissioned in 1990
  a  launched in 2002

Japanese Navy ship names
Japan Maritime Self-Defense Force ship names